Margot Jefferys (Margaret) (1916–1999) was Professor of Medical Sociology at Bedford College, London, from 1968 to 1982. She went to Berkhamsted Girls School.

References

1916 births
1999 deaths
British sociologists
British women academics
Academics of Bedford College, London
British women sociologists
Medical sociologists